David Snell may refer to:

David Snell (composer) (1897–1967), American composer of scores for 170 films
David Snell (musician) (born 1936), British harpist, composer and conductor
David Snell (screenwriter), Australian screenwriter, see AACTA Award for Best Adapted Screenplay
David Rees Snell (born 1966), television actor
Dave Snell, radio play-by-play announcer
David Snell (golfer) (1933–2021), English golfer